The fourth season of the American comedy television series Scrubs premiered on NBC on August 31, 2004 and concluded on May 10, 2005 and consists of 25 episodes. Heather Graham guest starred for an extended run for the first 8 episodes and then another appearance later in the season. Colin Farrell, Matthew Perry, Molly Shannon, Clay Aiken, and Tara Reid guest starred. This season was nominated for the Primetime Emmy Award for Outstanding Comedy Series.

As the season opens, Turk arrives from his honeymoon with Carla but they soon have issues when Carla tries to change many things about her new husband. Their marriage and Turk's friendship with J.D. are also endangered when J.D. and Carla share a drunken kiss. Dr. Cox and Jordan learn that their divorce was not final, but this seemingly good news causes friction. Elliot is still angry with J.D. for breaking her heart, and the situation becomes more uncomfortable still when she dates J.D.'s brother. J.D. has a new love interest of his own when a new and very attractive psychiatrist, Dr. Molly Clock (Heather Graham), arrives at Sacred Heart. Molly serves as Elliot's mentor during her time at the hospital.

Cast and characters

Main cast 
Zach Braff as Dr. John "J.D." Dorian
Sarah Chalke as Dr. Elliot Reid
Donald Faison as Dr. Chris Turk
Neil Flynn as The Janitor
Ken Jenkins as Dr. Bob Kelso
John C. McGinley as Dr. Perry Cox
Judy Reyes as Nurse Carla Espinosa

Recurring roles 
Robert Maschio as Dr. Todd Quinlan
Sam Lloyd as Ted Buckland
Christa Miller as Jordan Sullivan
Heather Graham as Dr. Molly Clock
Johnny Kastl as Dr. Doug Murphy
Aloma Wright as Nurse Laverne Roberts
Chrystee Pharris as Kylie
Martin Klebba as Randall Winston
Phill Lewis as Dr. Hooch
Josh Randall as Jake

Guest stars 
Tom Cavanagh as Dan Dorian
Richard Kind as Harvey Corman
Julianna Margulies as Neena Broderick
Clay Aiken as Kenny
Michael Boatman as Ron Laver
Colin Farrell as Billy Callahan
Jim Hanks as Dr. Turner
Masi Oka as Franklyn (MT)
Matthew Perry as Murray Marks
John Bennett Perry as Gregory Marks
Tara Reid as Danni Sullivan
Molly Shannon as Denise Lemmon
Chuck Woolery as himself
The Blanks as the Worthless Peons

Production 
Tad Quill and Bill Callahan, who Lawrence had worked with on Spin City, came on as co-executive producers. Bonnie Sikowiz returned to write an episode. David Feinberg was hired as a staff writer. Rich Eustis did not return.

Writing staff 
Bill Lawrence – executive producer/head writer
Eric Weinberg – co-executive producer
Matt Tarses – co-executive producer
Tim Hobert – co-executive producer
Neil Goldman and Garrett Donovan – co-executive producers
Gabrielle Allan – co-executive producer
Tad Quill – co-executive producer
Bill Callahan – co-executive producer
Mike Schwartz – producer
Debra Fordham – co-producer
Mark Stegemann – co-producer
Janae Bakken – co-producer
Angela Nissel – executive story editor
David Feinberg – staff writer

Production staff 
Bill Lawrence – executive producer/showrunner
Randall Winston – producer
Liz Newman – co-producer
Danny Rose – associate producer

Directors 
Includes directors who directed 2 or more episodes, or directors who are part of the cast and crew
Ken Whittingham (4 episodes)
Chris Koch (3 episodes)
Zach Braff (2 episodes)
Gail Mancuso (2 episodes)
Craig Zisk (2 episodes)
John Inwood (2 episodes)
Victor Nelli, Jr. (2 episodes)
Bill Lawrence (1 episode)
Matthew Perry (1 episode)
John Michel (editor) (1 episode)

Episodes

Notes 
† denotes a "supersized" episode, running an extended length of 25–28 minutes.

References 

General references

External links 

 

 
2004 American television seasons
2005 American television seasons
4